Dybäck Castle is a manor  at  Skurup Municipality in  Scania,  Sweden.
The estate was known from the 14th century. The  manor is actually a complex of several buildings. The oldest part of the manor was built in the late 15th century. Additions were made in the middle of the 16th century. The western parts  with the stair tower were built in the 17th century.

See also
List of castles in Sweden

References

 

Manor houses in Sweden
Buildings and structures in Skåne County